Doshmina is an upazila of Patuakhali District in the Division of Barisal, Bangladesh.

Geography
It has 19,863 households and a total area of 351.74 km2. The Upazila Headquarters is situated in Dashmina Sadar. It is situated on the Bank of the river Tetulia.

Within 6 unions of Dashmina including the Sadar at the centre, two of them are in the north of Dashmina Sadar namely Bashbaria and Bahrampur union. Bashbaria is situated on the bank of the river Tetulia. North Border of both Bahrampur and Bashbaria union ends up with starting of Baufal upazila. Rono Gopaldi and Betagi Shankipur union is situated on the north western part of Dashmina Sadar and finally the Alipura union covers the southern part of this historic Upazila which ends up with starting of Galachipa upazila.

Demographics
According to the 1991 Bangladesh census, Dashmina had a population of 106,539. Males constituted 49.5% of the population, and females 50.5%. The population aged 18 or older was 52,137. Dashmina had an average literacy rate of 29.5% (7+ years), compared to the national average of 32.4%.

Administration
Dashmina Upazila is divided into six union parishads: Alipur, Bahrampur, Banshbaria, Betagi Shankipur, Dashmina, and Rangopaldi. The union parishads are subdivided into 51 mauzas and 55 villages.

Education
At present it holds three colleges, three Boys' high schools, two girls' schools, an Alia Madrasa and a number of government and non government primary schools.
 Abdur Rashid Talukdar Degree
College
 Alipura College
 Doli Akbar Mohila College
 Dashmina Govt. Model High School
 Gachhani Secondary School
 Begum Arefatunnessa Girls High School
 Banglabazar Girls High School
 Hazirhat Nimmo maddhomik
Biddyalaoy
 Dashmina Senior Fazil Madrasha
 BM Labrotary School
 Bahrampur High School

See also
 Upazilas of Bangladesh
 Districts of Bangladesh
 Divisions of Bangladesh

References

Upazilas of Patuakhali District